Nils Schumann (born 20 May 1978) is a former German athlete, winner of the 800 m at the 2000 Summer Olympics, who retired in 2009. For most of the five years before his retirement he had featured sparingly at an international level due to injuries.

Schumann, born in Bad Frankenhausen, began his career as a footballer in 1984 before switching to athletics.  He won a gold medal over 800 m at the 1998 European Athletics Indoor Championships in Valencia. At the European Championships in Budapest in the same year, he won the title in a close finish. A few weeks later he also won the 800 m race at the World Cup in Johannesburg.

He also made the final of the 1999 World Athletics Championships, but placed 8th and last. He had a quiet 2000 season, until the Olympics started in Sydney. Schumann cruised through the preliminaries, easily qualifying for the final. In the final, Schumann set in his final sprint at the last straight, taking the lead with just 50 m to go. Favourite Wilson Kipketer of Denmark gained in the closing meters, but was unable to prevent a surprise victory by the German runner. In the following year, Schumann finished in fifth place at the 2001 World Championships in Athletics in Edmonton.

Schumann, who also won a bronze medal at the 2002 European Championships, was unable to defend his Olympic title at the 2004 Summer Olympics in Athens, suffering from injury throughout the 2004 season.

Competition record

Beyond retirement
On 3 March 2008 Schumann married the 400 meter runner Korinna Fink.   That was the year in which he set up his own business:  he also advertises his services as a personal trainer, based in Erfurt.

References

External links 
 

1978 births
Living people
People from Bad Frankenhausen
German male middle-distance runners
German national athletics champions
Olympic athletes of Germany
Athletes (track and field) at the 2000 Summer Olympics
Olympic gold medalists for Germany
European Athletics Championships medalists
Sportspeople from Thuringia
Medalists at the 2000 Summer Olympics
Olympic gold medalists in athletics (track and field)